The imitator miner bee (Andrena imitatrix) is a species of miner bee in the family Andrenidae. It is found in North America.

References

Further reading

External links

 

imitatrix
Articles created by Qbugbot
Insects described in 1872